Gelsemium sempervirens is a twining vine in the family Gelsemiaceae, native to subtropical and tropical America: Honduras, Guatemala, Belize, Mexico (Chiapas, Oaxaca, Veracruz, Puebla, Hidalgo), and southeastern and south-central United States (from Texas to Virginia). It has a number of common names including yellow jessamineor confederate jessamineorjasmine, Carolina jasmine or jessamine, evening trumpetflower, gelsemium and woodbine.

Yellow jessamine is the state flower of South Carolina.

Despite its common name, the species is not a "true jasmine" and not of the genus Jasminum.

Growth
The plant is perennial. Its flowers are strongly scented and produce nectar that attracts a range of pollinators.

History
Some 19th century sources identified Gelsemium sempervirens as a folk remedy for various medical conditions.

Toxicity
All parts of this plant contain the toxic strychnine-related alkaloids gelsemine and gelseminine and should not be consumed. The sap may cause skin irritation in sensitive individuals. Children, mistaking this flower for honeysuckle, have been poisoned by sucking the nectar from the flower. The nectar is also toxic to honeybees, which may cause brood death when gathered by the bees. The nectar may, however, be beneficial to bumblebees. It has been shown that bumblebees fed on gelsemine have a reduced load of Crithidia bombi in their fecal matter after 7 days, although this difference was not significant after 10 days. Reduced parasite load increases foraging efficiency, and pollinators may selectively collect otherwise toxic secondary metabolites as a means of self-medication.

The plant can be lethal to livestock.

Cultivation
Despite the hazards, this is a popular garden plant in warmer areas, frequently being trained to grow over arbors or to cover walls. In the UK, it has won the Royal Horticultural Society's Award of Garden Merit. It can be grown outdoors in mild and coastal areas of the UK (to a lower limit of ), but elsewhere must be grown under glass. It requires a sheltered position in full sun or light shade.

Gallery

See also
 List of poisonous plants
 Gelsemium elegans
 Gelsemium rankinii

References

Further reading
  This contains a detailed description of the then-common usage and dosage of the drug.

Gelsemiaceae
Flora of the Southeastern United States
Flora of Central America
Medicinal plants of Central America
Medicinal plants of North America
Plants described in 1753
Taxa named by Carl Linnaeus
Symbols of South Carolina
Flora of Mexico
Flora of Texas
Flora without expected TNC conservation status